Jesús Miralles (born 1912) is a Cuban former pitcher who played in the Negro leagues in the 1930s.

A native of Matanzas, Cuba, Miralles played for the Cuban Stars (East) in 1935 and again in 1937. In four recorded career appearances on the mound, he posted a 5.40 ERA over 33.1 innings.

References

External links
Baseball statistics and player information from Baseball-Reference Black Baseball Stats and Seamheads

1912 births
Date of birth missing
Year of death missing
Cuban Stars (East) players
Baseball pitchers
Sportspeople from Matanzas
Cuban expatriate baseball players in the United States